The 2014 Supercopa de Chile was the second edition of this championship organised by the Asociación Nacional de Fútbol Profesional (ANFP).

The match was played between the 2013–14 Primera División Best-Champions O'Higgins, and the 2013–14 Copa Chile Winners Deportes Iquique.

O'Higgins won its first Supercopa in his history, winning 3–2 on penalties, after a 1–1 draw at the end of 120 minutes with goals of Rodrigo Díaz for Iquique and Luis Pedro Figueroa for O'Higgins.

Match

The match was disputed at Estadio San Carlos de Apoquindo in Santiago as a neutral stadium, and the referee chosen for the match was Roberto Tobar.

In the first half, Rodrigo Díaz scored to make it 1–0 for Iquique at the 5th minute. At minute 8', O'Higgins striker Pablo Calandria suffered a ruptured cruciate ligament, making a substitution for Diego Cháves. Later in the 38' Luis Pedro Figueroa scored for O'Higgins to level the game at 1–1.

In the second half, both teams had many chances to score, but they were not taken advantage of, especially O'Higgins, who had two one on one opportunities with goalkeeper Rodrigo Naranjo. The score eventually ended 1–1 after extra time, and the match was decided on penalty kicks.

In the penalty shootout, Opazo, Huerta and Figueroa scored for O'Higgins, Chaves, Vargas and Uglessich missed, meanwhile for Iquique Romero and Villalobos scored, but Zenteno, Pinares, Díaz and Brito failed their penalties, which gave the title to the celestes.

Road to the final

The two teams that disputed the Supercopa were O'Higgins, that qualified as Apertura 2013–14 Champion and the Best Champion in the accumulated table, and Deportes Iquique, that qualified as the winner of the 2013–14 Copa Chile, where it beat Huachipato 3–1 at the Estadio Monumental in the final.

Details

Champions

Statistics

References

Super
Association football penalty shoot-outs
O'Higgins F.C. matches
Deportes Iquique matches